The 1989 Nevada Wolf Pack football team represented the University of Nevada, Reno during the 1989 NCAA Division I-AA football season. Nevada competed as a member of the Big Sky Conference (BSC). The Wolf Pack were led by 14th-year head coach Chris Ault and played their home games at Mackay Stadium.

Schedule

References

Nevada
Nevada Wolf Pack football seasons
Nevada Wolf Pack football